Keila is a town and an urban municipality in Harju County in north-western Estonia, 25 km southwest of Tallinn. Keila is also the location of administrative buildings of the surrounding Keila Parish, a rural municipality separate from the town itself.

History

The oldest traces of human settlement in Keila trace back 2000 to 3000 years BC. Around 1000 years ago the village of Keila was established along the Keila river. In 1219 the Danish conquered Northern-Estonia and chose Keila as the site on which the Vomentakæ parochial Revala county church was to be built. The first church was a small wooden structure dedicated primarily to St. Michael which was replaced with a stone church at the end of the 13th century. Subsequently, the first written mention of Keila (Keikŋl) comes from Danish evaluation book writings in 1241.

In the 15th-16th century, a settlement comprising some tens of buildings and a hundred people formed around the church. At the same time the Livonian Order built a small fort south-east of the church on jõesaare (Known today as Jõepark). Ruins of the fort were first excavated in 1976 with continued finds up to 2007.

During the Livonian War of 1558-1583 the settlement, including the church (Later restored in 1596), was destroyed. Further hampered by the plague and starvation in 1601-1602 the population decline reduced the community to a small church village. This was to be the case for three centuries. An upturn began in the second half of the 20th century. One of the first notable cultural events was the erection of a statue of Martin Luther in 1862 near the kirikumõis (Church manor). However the statue was completely destroyed in 1949. In 1885 the first song festival was held in Keila. The festival was composed of 19 choirs and supervised by Konstantin Türnpu from Klooga. In 1867 the first school was opened in Väljaotsa farm celebrating the start of education in Keila.

The development of Keila took a turn with the establishment of the Tallinn-Paldiski railway in 1870.

Keila officially became a town on 1 May 1938.

After the railway to Keila was built, the place became known — as a pun — as Kegelbahn.
Keila has a station on the Elron rail line.

Military base
During Soviet times a military base, known as the "Tankipolk", was built on the outskirts of the town for the housing of soldiers and tanks. The base was demolished a few years after the Soviet army left the country. Years later a residential district was built on the site of the base. The woodland areas around it have also been cleaned up and turned into paved, and partially lit, paths. During winter the area acts as a skiing track with many hills and paths. The largest of the hills is known as "Tankimägi" or "Tank Hill".

 no more than a few building foundations remain of the base.

Nature 
The city is situated largely on a big hill known as Keila hill and on the valley of Keila River. On the westernmost side of Keila there is Niitvälja Bog.

454 million year old limestone, that can be seen outcropping in the city, is known as Keila stage. This name was given by Carl Friedrich Schmidt to distinguish layer of limestone, that is located between Jõhvi and Vasalemma stage.

Education

There are several schools in Keila.

 Keila High School
 Keila Joint High School
 Keila Music School

and 3 kindergartens.

Population
According to the 2011 Census, the population was 10,014.

According to the 2009 Census, the population was 9,873.

According to the 2000 Census, the population was 9,388. 82.8% were Estonians, 12.1% Russians, 1.8% 
Ukrainians, 0.9% Finns, 0.7% Belarusians, 0.2% Lithuanians, 0.1% Poles, 0.1% Tatars, 0.1% Germans and 0.1% Latvians.
According to the 2011,July,1st Census, the population was 10030.

Religion

International relations

Twin towns — sister cities
Keila is twinned with:

 Chiatura, Georgia
 Nacka, Sweden
 Huittinen, Finland
 Kerava, Finland
 Barsbüttel, Germany
 Sigulda, Latvia
 Birštonas, Lithuania

Notable residents
Jekaterina Golovatenko (born 1979), figure skater
Ülo Jõgi (1921–2007), war historian and national activist
Astrid Lepa (1924–2015), actress and director
Pearu Paulus (born 1967), singer and composer
Ago Silde (born 1963), politician
Siiri Sisask (born 1968), singer and politician
Kärt Tomingas (born 1967), singer and actress
Nublu (unknown), rapper 
Peeter Volkonski (born 1954), actor, rock-musician and composer
Oleksandr Yakymenko (born 1964), politician, former head of the Security Service of Ukraine

See also
Keila JK

References

External links

Harjumaa Museum

Populated places in Harju County
Cities and towns in Estonia
Municipalities of Estonia
Kreis Harrien